Stewart Charles Hamilton Douglas-Mann (born 6 February 1938 in Sussex, England), an alumnus of St Edmund Hall, Oxford, is a former British rower.

Rowing career
Douglas-Mann competed as the bow in the 1959 Boat Races for Oxford which they won.

Representing England, Douglas-Mann won a silver medal in the men's coxless pair in the 1958 British Empire and Commonwealth Games.

References

Living people
1938 births
Oxford University Boat Club rowers
British male rowers
Rowers at the 1958 British Empire and Commonwealth Games
Commonwealth Games medallists in rowing
Commonwealth Games silver medallists for England
Medallists at the 1958 British Empire and Commonwealth Games